The R616 road is a regional road in County Cork, Ireland.

References

Regional roads in the Republic of Ireland
Roads in County Cork